The Sound of Music by Pizzicato Five is a compilation album by Japanese pop band Pizzicato Five. The album was released in the United States on October 31, 1995 by Matador Records, serving as the band's second full-length, and third overall, American release on the label. Following Made in USA, The Sound of Music by Pizzicato Five is Matador's second compilation of Pizzicato Five's previously released material.

The track selection emphasizes the band's albums Bossa Nova 2001 (1993) and Overdose (1994), while Romantique 96 (1995), their most recent studio album at the time, is represented by one track, a cover of Plastics' "Good". The title The Sound of Music and the front cover slogan "music is organised by sound" are taken from the Romantique 96 song "The Sound of Music", though the track itself does not appear on the compilation.

The LP edition has a slightly rearranged track order and contains alternate versions of "Good", "Fortune Cookie" and "Rock n' Roll".

Track listing

Notes
 "Happy Sad", "If I Were a Groupie" and "CDJ" feature re-recorded English vocals.

References

External links
 

1995 compilation albums
Pizzicato Five albums
Matador Records compilation albums
Japanese-language compilation albums